Cochoapa el Grande  is one of the 81 municipalities of Guerrero, in south-western Mexico. The municipal seat lies at Cochoapa el Grande.  As of 2005, the municipality had a total population of 15,572. 
It is one of the newer municipalities of Guerrero, formed on June 13, 2003

References

Municipalities of Guerrero